Tshegofatso Ketshabile, known professionally as Tshego is a South African-American singer-songwriter. He gained prominence in 2016, after releasing his hit single "Hennessy" and release of his debut album Pink Panther (2019).

Early life 
Tshego was born to two ordained ministers on 21 May 1990 in Atlanta, Georgia United States where his parents were studying. He frequently visited South Africa from the age of 4 until he eventually relocated and settled in Mafikeng to focus on his music career.

Career
In May 2020, Tshego signed a record deal with Def Jam Africa, a flagship of Def Jam Recordings.

Personal life 
Tshego has previously admitted to being a drug addict in 2016. Tshego has a daughter born on 12 July 2019 with Lola Kyle.

Discography

Studio albums

Single discography

Awards and nominations

References

External links 

 

Living people
South African artists
South African songwriters
South African rappers
South African record producers
1990 births